KLIF may refer to:

KLIF (AM), a radio station (570 AM) licensed to Dallas, Texas, United States
KLIF-FM, a radio station (93.3 FM) licensed to Haltom City, Texas, United States